Rolf Solli (born 1953) is a Swedish organizational theorist and Professor of Management at the University of Borås. During 2003-2012 he was Director and Professor of Management Studies at GRI, Gothenburg Research Institute, School of Business, Economics and Law at Göteborg University, Sweden.

His research focuses on processes of management, leadership and accounting mainly in the context of public sector organizations. He has published more than fifteen books, among which Low-voiced control. Perspective on civil finance officers in local government, (SNS, 1999), a volume edited with Barbara Czarniawska Organizing Metropolitan Space and Discourse, (Liber, 2001) and Constructing Leadership: Reflections on Film Heroes as Leaders with Björn Rombach (Santérus Academic Press, 2006).

Prior to his present position, Rolf Solli was for many years Head of School of Public Administration at Göteborg University.

References

1953 births
Living people
Swedish business theorists
Academic staff of the University of Gothenburg
Postmodern theory
Academic staff of the University of Borås